Hans-Werner Gessmann (born 24 March 1950, in Duisburg) is a German psychologist, founder of humanistic psychodrama and university teacher in Russia, India and Africa, one of the best known psychotherapists worldwide.

Career 
Gessmann received a doctorate in 1976 by his work about causation factors of Dyslexia. He is the founder of humanistic psychodrama and adopted in the same year for the first time psychodrama with hypnosis in the context of sexual dysfunctions. In the last twenty years he concentrated on diagnosis and therapy of transgender people and is in Germany accepted as a court expert. He also established humanistic psychodrama in the field of child psychotherapy. In the early 80s he began making film-documentations about complete group-psychotherapy-sessions in European countries. He is the publisher of book series and the International Journal of Humanistic Psychodrama. Gessmann is one of the few empirical researchers in the field of psychodrama and has published over 180 articles on psychological topics. Standards continued his research on the method of doubling from 1996. He is the only author in the German-speaking area, who handled this issue fundamentally and scientifically, including translations of the complete source texts from English.

In 1973 he founded the Psychotherapeutisches Institut Bergerhausen (PIB) in Duisburg and in 1977 nearby Kerpen, Germany a European training center now for more than 1500 psychotherapists.

In 1986, Gessmann founded Germany's first home-based sleep laboratory with the Department of Sleep Medicine. From 1998 to 2002, under his guidance, the tongue muscle training with the registered trademark ZMT  ®  was developed as an alternative treatment against sleep apnea.

Gessmann developed and has taught humanistic psychodrama since 1979 as a new form of psychodrama. It became an integral part of humanistic psychology.  Gessmann moved the collective action and nature of the people at the center of the therapeutic ethic.  Faith, love, hope, and the idea of a human community are essential to meaningful humanistic psychodrama. Intuitive look for detecting the wholeness of a thing, the dialectical conception of polarities, the renunciation of absolute authority, take decisive influence on the image and life of man. The goals and methods of classical psychodrama were necessarily re-evaluated and described. This led to a fundamental change in international psychodrama practice. Through his work in many countries and with many different people of different ages, he was able to gain extensive experience, which in turn was very helpful for his future work. He understand new and strange situations and people faster and better. Working with different multicultural people taught him more and more that there is no single type of real life, but that there are an infinite number of individual ways of life and that every person has the right to decide for himself how he would like to shape his life. Good empathy and accepting knowledge of the difference between different people is a crucial prerequisite for successful therapeutic work. The humanistic image of man is guiding him and his work.

Gessmann is a member of the American Society of Group Psychotherapy and Psychodrama as well as the International Association of Group Psychotherapy and Psychodrama since 1977.

Gessmann teaches clinical psychology in the faculty of social psychology of the  Kostroma (KSU) since 2007 and is a professor of general and developmental psychology in the governmental Academy of Social Administration Moscow (ASOU).

After introduction of the test for medical study courses (TMS, colloquially also medicine test) 1986 this was reconstructed for training in the original by Gessmann several times. These training versions are published under the title Ü-TMS.

In April 2011 it was announced he would be the director of the International Centre for Clinical Psychology and Psychotherapy (ICCPP) at the governmental University Kostroma with a focus on psychotherapy training and research, particularly humanistic psychodrama and systemic family therapy. In March 2020 he changed his activity from Kostroma to the State Medical Medicine University in Krasnoyarsk. He started to work here in cooperation together with the International Center of Clinical Psychology and Psychotherapy The ICCPP was growing fast, working in more than 30 countries with over 200 specialists.

With the beginning of 2013 Gessmann is a visiting professor at the State University Smolensk. Here he teaches Humanistic Psychodrama. In the same year Gessmann receives a call to the Chair for Humanistic Psychodrama at the Southeast University in Nanjing province Jiansu, one of the oldest universities in China. He was added from Stanford University U.C. in Berkeley to the list of the 30 most influential psychologists working today and from the Harvard university to the list of 30 most influential living counseling psychologists. In September 2017, Hans-Werner Gessmann introduced group psychotherapy in Azerbaijan for the first time. 141 psychotherapists from the country took part in the event in Baku. 2019 Member of the International Organizing Committee of the VI. International Scientific and practical Conference at the State Krasnoyarsk Medical University Prof. V.F. Volno-Yasenetzky. Working as a longterm visiting professor for Clinical psychology and psychotherapy since March 2020 at the State Krasnoyarsk Medical University Prof. V.F. Volno-Yasenetzky. From May 2021 to December 2022 he was Adjunctive Professor at the Madras Social Work Academy in Chennai for Humanistic Psychology. June 2021 Appointment as head of the department of psychology at DMI - St. John the Baptist University in Malawi / Central Africa. 2021-2023 International Member of the American Psychological Association (APA). In March and April 2023, Gessmann has been invited to teach humanistic psychodrama as psychotherapy and to give lectures on psychosomatics at CHRIST (deemed to be University) in New Delhi and in Bangalore. He is supported in India by his scientific assistant Vishal Lohchab.

Awards 
2010 - Award for international communication between Russia and Germany
2010 - State University Kostroma: honorary professor of the Faculty of Social Psychology
2011 - State University Kostroma: honorary professor of the University
2014 - State Psychological Paedagogic University Moscow: honorary professor of the University
2014 - International Institute of Informazation and Public Administration Named in the Honor of P.A. Stolypin: honorary professor of the institute
2021 - World Teacher Award 2021 from Educational and Psychological Research Centre Madurai, Tamil Nadu, India
 2022: International Honorary Life Membership - Global Institute of Counseling Professionals - Sri Lanka
 2022: Honorary Advisor - Divine Bliss Foundation - Kolkata/India

Publications 
 Übungslehrbuch zum psychologischen Test für das Studium der Medizin, Zahnmedizin und Tiermedizin. Ü-PTM 14. Jungjohann Verlag, Neckarsulm 1981.
 Components for group psychotherapy. (Ed.). Jungjohann Verlag, Neckarsulm, Band 1 1984, Band 2 1987; Band 3 1990.
 Trainingtest for medical program of study 95/96 im Originalformat. 3. Testrevision, Jungjohann Verlagsgesellschaft, Neckarsulm/Stuttgart 1995
 The Humanistic Psychodrama. In: International Journal of Humanistic Psychodrama. June 1995, 1. Jahrgang, PIB Publisher, Duisburg, Germany.
 Humanistic Psychodrama. Vol 4. (Ed.). Verlag des PIB, Duisburg 1996.
 Forms of psychotherapy - introductions. (Russische Bearbeitung: Elena Oladova). PIB Publisher, Duisburg, Germany, 2011.
 Empirischer Beitrag zur Prüfung der Wirksamkeit psychodramatischer Gruppenpsychotherapie bei NeurosepatientInnen (ICD-10: F3, F4) The effects of psychodramatic group psychotherapy with neurosis patients — an empirical contribution (ICD-10: F3, F4) Springer Verlag: Zeitschrift für Psychodrama und Soziometrie Volume 10, Supplement 1, 69-87, DOI: 10.1007/s11620-011-0128-3
 Субъективные теории болезни / пер. на рус. яз. Е. А. Шеронов. – Кострома 2014: КГУ им. Н. А. Некрасова. 
 Транс-идентичность – стандарты диагностики и лечения. Психологическая наука и образование psyedu.ru. 2014. Т.6. №3. С.160–167. URL:psyjournals.ru/psyedu_ru/2014/n3/71377.shtml (дата обращения: 31.10.2014)
 Системная терапия и консультирование. (Russische Bearbeitung: Elena Oladova/русское предисловие: Olesya Volkova). (Aichach: PIB Publisher) 2020, p640, ; 
 Humanistyczna psychodrama tom 5. Gessmann/Kinga. Verlag des PIB Duisburg; Auflage: 1. Ausgabe (2021) in polnischer Sprache.
 Statistic – Introduction to statistical tests for beginners. Lohchab/Gessmann. Verlag des PIB Aichach 2022. Englisch p338, 
 Gessmann, H.-W.; Lohchab, V.: Transidentity. Verlag des PIB, Aichach 2022. Englisch p220

Film productions 
 "Want to be healthy?" - an introduction to the bibliodrama", Verlag des PIB, Duisburg 1994
 Gessmann/Hossbach: Peter Härtling - Mourning and consolation. Development of a literary text using scenic methods from the Humanistic Psychodrama, Verlag des PIB, Duisburg 2006
 Gessmann/Opdensteinen: Rainer Maria Rilke - Der Panther. Theaterprojekt der Kölner Nordpark Förderschule Lernen mit Methoden des Humanistischen Psychodramas, Verlag des PIB, Duisburg 2008
 Methods of humanistic psychodrama (digitized revision of 1989) - selected methods of the humanistic psychodrama: First Scene interview, double, auxiliary ego, role reversal, social atom, impromptu scenes creative warming-up. Verlag des PIB, Duisburg 2008
 "There was no champagne anymore" (revised edition digitized recording of a documentary from 1989 on the treatment of a labor disruption by means of Humanistic Psychodrama). Verlag des PIB, 2008
 Gessmann/Romeik: Psalm 23 - He is my shepherd. Humanistic Psychodrama with biblical text. Verlag des PIB, Duisburg, 2009
 «Шампанское закончилось» Использование игры протагонистов гуманистической психодрамы в работе с нарушениями отношенийб. Издательство ПИБ, Дуисбург 2009
 Gessmann/Passmann: Der Querk im Lummerland. Humanistic Psychodrama with preschool children. Verlag des PIB, Duisburg 2009
 Gessmann/Vieten: Humanistic Psychodrama with the elderly and old people. Marienkloster 2009. Verlag des PIB, Duisburg 2009
 Kindheit und Jugend in der NS-Zeit – Dokumentation einer Zeitzeugenbefragung am Städtischen Gymnasium Straelen. Verlag des PIB, Duisburg 2010
 „Today, I cook, tomorrow I brew …“ - A "touching" story. Protagonist-centered humanistic psychological drama about a dream. Verlag des PIB, Duisburg 2011
 Methods of systemic therapy 1: Der Einsatz des Familienbrettes in verschiedenen systemtherapeutischen Schulen. Verlag des PIB, Duisburg 2011
 Children psychodrama therapy. Documentation about the beginning of therapy. Verlag des PIB, Duisburg 2011

References

External links 
 

Living people
1950 births
People from Duisburg
German psychologists
Humanistic psychologists